Yogeshwari Mahavidyalaya, also known as Yogeshwari College of Science, is an undergraduate and postgraduate, coeducational college situated in Ambajogai, Beed district, Maharashtra. It was established in the year 1935. Yogrshwari education society founder is swami ramanand tirth, The college is affiliated with Dr. Babasaheb Ambedkar Marathwada University.

Departments

Science
Physics
Mathematics
Chemistry
Electronics
Botany
Microbiology
Zoology
Computer Science
Dairy Science
polytechnic

Accreditation
The college is  recognized by the University Grants Commission (UGC).

References

External links

Dr. Babasaheb Ambedkar Marathwada University
Universities and colleges in Maharashtra
Educational institutions established in 1935
1935 establishments in India